is a Japanese hurdler. He competed in the men's 400 metres hurdles at the 1964 Summer Olympics.

References

1938 births
Living people
Place of birth missing (living people)
Japanese male hurdlers
Olympic male hurdlers
Olympic athletes of Japan
Athletes (track and field) at the 1964 Summer Olympics
Asian Games silver medalists for Japan
Asian Games bronze medalists for Japan
Asian Games medalists in athletics (track and field)
Athletes (track and field) at the 1962 Asian Games
Medalists at the 1962 Asian Games
Japan Championships in Athletics winners
20th-century Japanese people
21st-century Japanese people